Charles Dunning (17 January 1878 – 6 December 1955) was a New Zealand rugby footballer who was part of the professional 1907–1908 New Zealand rugby tour of Great Britain.

Early years
Dunning was born on 17 January 1878 in Mahurangi, north of Auckland. His mother was Margaret Mackay Dunning and his father was Rufus Dunning. His sister Frankie Regina Dunning was born in 1880, a brother Arthur Rufus was born and died in 1881. A sister, Una Nicholas Irene also died within a year of birth in 1882, while another sister was born in 1883 but passed away in 1886 aged just 3. Another sister Eleanor was born in 1883, and sister Eva was born in 1884. Uriel was born in 1884 but died two years later in 1886. Dunning was a builder by trade.

Rugby football
Dunning originally played rugby union for Ponsonby in 1900, before moving to Gisborne and playing there between 1903 and 1904. When he returned to Auckland, Dunning represented the region between 1905 and 1907, becoming a key member of the Ranfurly Shield winning team. Dunning was selected for North Island in 1906.

Rugby league
Dunning was selected for the professional All Blacks 1907–1908 tour of Australia and Great Britain and subsequently received a life ban from the New Zealand Rugby Union. Dunning and Billy Wynyard were the last two players to join the squad, after they had been representing Auckland against Hawke's Bay Rugby Union. He played in one test match while on tour, against Great Britain.

On his return to New Zealand Dunning, along with Billy Tyler, helped found the Ponsonby United Rugby League club. In 1909 Dunning played for Auckland but did not tour with the 1909 New Zealand side. However, in 1910 he captained the side against the touring Great Britain and also captained the Auckland tour of New Zealand at the end of the year. He was part of New Zealand tours of Australia in 1911 and 1912.

Later years
Dunning suffered a leg injury, losing the patella in his right knee in World War I and walked with a stick until his death in 1955.

References

1878 births
1955 deaths
New Zealand rugby league players
New Zealand rugby union players
Auckland rugby union players
New Zealand national rugby league team players
Ponsonby Ponies players
Auckland rugby league team players
New Zealand builders
New Zealand national rugby league team captains
New Zealand military personnel of World War I
Footballers who switched code
Rugby league props
Rugby league second-rows